Ophraella is a genus of beetles belonging to the family Chrysomelidae.

Species
Species within this genus include:
 Ophraella americana (Fabricius, 1801)
 Ophraella arctica LeSage, 1986
 Ophraella artemisia Futuyma, 1990
 Ophraella bilineata (Kirby, 1837)
 Ophraella bivittata (Blatchley, 1920)
 Ophraella californiana LeSage, 1986
 Ophraella communa LeSage, 1986
 Ophraella conferta (LeConte, 1865)
 Ophraella cribrata (LeConte, 1865)
 Ophraella godmani (Jacoby, 1886)
 Ophraella integra (LeConte, 1865)
 Ophraella limonensis Bechyne, 1997
 Ophraella macrovittata LeSage, 1986
 Ophraella magdalia Bechyne, 1997
 Ophraella notata (Fabricius, 1801)
 Ophraella notulata (Fabricius, 1801)
 Ophraella nuda LeSage, 1986
 Ophraella pilosa LeSage, 1986
 Ophraella sexvittata (LeConte, 1865)
 Ophraella slobodkini Futuyma, 1991

References 

Galerucinae
Chrysomelidae genera